The Triathlon competitions at the 2014 Commonwealth Games, in Glasgow, were held in Strathclyde Country Park. The men's and women's individual events were held on Thursday 24 July   and women's triathlon was the first medal event of the Games. Mixed team relay was held on Saturday 26 July for the first time ever in major multi-sport Games. Marisol Casado, ITU President and IOC member, commented: "We are delighted the Glasgow 2014 Organising Committee has embraced the Triathlon Mixed Relay. Triathlon is on currently on a high in the United Kingdom, and the Mixed Relay will offer an extra opportunity for the people of Glasgow to watch another thrilling and unpredictable event live on their city streets."

England dominated the competition, taking all three titles, and five medals in total. Alistair Brownlee and Jodie Stimpson won two gold medals each. The victory for Brownlee meant that he had won all senior international titles available to him : the Olympic, World, European and Commonwealth titles for triathlon.

Format
The Triathlon events at the XX Commonwealth Games were conducted under the ITU Competition Rules and in accordance with the Commonwealth Games Federation (CGF) Constitution.

The men's and women's individual events were at distance -  swim,  cycle, and a  run. The competitions took place as single events between all competitors with no heats.

The mixed relay was contested at the Commonwealth Games for the first time. This event was contested by teams of two men and two women who each complete a 250m swim, 6 km bike and 1600m run leg before passing on to the next athlete in the team. Race order: women-man-women-man.

Competition venue 
On the south eastern edge of Glasgow, Strathclyde Country Park provided an excellent venue for Triathlon. This attractive course, using the loch for swimming and the surrounding network of roads and paths for the cycling and running phases, was already an established national triathlon venue.

Individual race course

swim course – 1,500m. The swim took place in the Strathclyde Loch on a course consisting of two laps of 750m.

bike course – 40 km. The bike course consisted of five laps of an 8 km course.

run course – 10 km. The run course consisted of three laps of 3.33 km each and used part of the bike course.

Mixed Relay course

swim course – 250m. The swim took place in the Strathclyde Loch on a course consisting of one lap.

bike course – 6 km. The bike course consisted of one lap of a 6 km course.

run course – 1.6 km. The run course consisted of two laps.

Schedule
All times are British Summer Time (UTC+1). All event times are subject to change.

Medal summary

Medal table

References
"Glasgow 2014 Triathlon Events at Strathclyde Park". Triathlonscotland.org. 21 July 2014

External links
Official results book – Triathlon

 
2014 in triathlon
2014
2014 Commonwealth Games events
Triathlon competitions in the United Kingdom
Sport in North Lanarkshire
Triathlon in Scotland